"Macho Man" is a song by American disco group Village People, released as the second single and title song of their eponymous album (1978). The song entered the Billboard Hot 100 on June 24, 1978 (when the album had already been charting since March) before picking up more airplay that August. It became the Village People's first charting hit in the United States, peaking on the Hot 100 at number 25 on the week of September 2.

A medley with "I Am What I Am" and "Key West" reached number four on the Billboard Dance Music/Club Play Singles chart.  On the survey of Chicago radio superstation WLS-AM, "Macho Man" spent two weeks at number three.

Background
Martin Aston writes, in his book Breaking Down the Walls of Heartache: A History of How Music Came Out, that Jacques Morali, already having a lead singer with Victor Willis, and after what he calls the "more comical than sexy: unrehearsed" promo video for the song "San Francisco (You've Got Me)", placed the advert "Macho types wanted: must dance and have a moustache" in the trade press. Village People cowboy Randy Jones recalled, "The Monday after Thanksgiving (1977), we signed contracts and the Tuesday after, we were in studio recording "Macho Man", with Victor Willis' handwritten lyrics that were written in the morning with egg stains and coffee rings on it. Everything was happening that quickly."

Critical reception
Billboard described the song as a "spirited fast paced percussive track highlighted by multi -part harmonies and a rugged lead vocal."  Cash Box said that "this funky number should be a dance floor hit" and praised the hook.  Record World called it an "energetic dance-r&b tune" whose "vocal is good...with a touch of humor."

Music video
Aston writes that it was "back to the gym for 'Macho Man'" and that "[t]he aesthetic of Bob Mizer's Physique Pictorial was now all over national TV in a Village People music video." The band members are seen working out and dancing in a gym while performing the song.

Charts

Weekly charts

Year-end charts

Certifications and sales

In popular culture 
A year after the song's release in 1978, it was performed by the Muppet characters Link Hogthrob and The Great Gonzo on The Muppet Show in episode 5, with guest star Victor Borge, of their fourth season. Also in 1979, Donald Duck released a parody, with the title "Macho Duck", on the Disney audio release Mickey Mouse Disco. The song was featured in many movies, such as Addams Family Values, In & Out and Terminator 3: Rise of the Machines.

Later in 1994, in the episode "Homer Loves Flanders" of the animated sitcom The Simpsons, Homer Simpson sang this song as "Nacho Man", and soon after, in 1995, the song was featured in an Old El Paso commercial, with lyrics changed to "Nacho, nacho, man". In that same year on Friends, in 'The One Where Ross Finds Out' the song plays during Monica (Courteney Cox) and Chandler's (Matthew Perry) exercising.

In the 1997 episode of Buffy The Vampire Slayer, titled Witch, Buffy performs the song's chorus while under a spell that leaves her throwing a fellow cheerleader across the gymnasium, the song foreshadows the event by satire. The song is featured in the 1996 film The Nutty Professor and the 2000 film Nutty Professor II: The Klumps.  The race horse, Mucho Macho Man, who won the 2013 Breeders' Cup Classic and was third in the 2011 Kentucky Derby, was named after the song. In 2017 the song was featured in the "lip-sync for your life" segment on the eleventh episode of the ninth season of RuPaul's Drag Race between contestants Alexis Michelle and Peppermint. Peppermint won the lip-sync and remained in the competition while Alexis Michelle was eliminated.

In 2020, the song was frequently used at rallies for US President Donald Trump. Originally, the band stated that Trump was entitled to use the song, provided it was not used in a way that suggested endorsement however on June 5, Victor Willis issued a statement on Facebook saying that Trump would no longer be welcome to use the song if Trump followed through on his threat to set the military on Black Lives Matter protestors. The song was used at the Trump rally in Warren, Michigan in September 2020. On November 8, Alec Baldwin, in character as Trump, performed a ballad version of "Macho Man" on a Saturday Night Live skit in which Baldwin's Trump played the song as part of a concession speech for losing the 2020 presidential election, echoing SNL's first episode after the 2016 election, which opened with Kate McKinnon, as Hillary Clinton, performing Leonard Cohen's "Hallelujah" while seated at a piano.

References

Village People songs
1978 singles
Songs written by Jacques Morali
Songs written by Henri Belolo
Songs written by Victor Willis
Casablanca Records singles
Disco songs
Song recordings produced by Jacques Morali
1977 songs